Aleksey Valentinovich Morozov (born 16 November 1979) is a Russian theatre actor and film director. He appeared in over 40 films.

Biography
Aleksey Morozov was born on 16 November 1979. Since childhood, he was fascinated by acting. In the second grade, he played the main role in the television play The Journey of the Blue Arrow, at the age of 14 he was admitted to the theater studio Imagine at the St. Petersburg television. He studied to be an actor at the Russian State Institute of Performing Arts. In 2001 he was invited to join the troupe of the Maly Drama Theatre.

Selected filmography

References

External links 
 Aleksey Morozov on kino-teatr.ru

1979 births
Living people
Male actors from Saint Petersburg
Russian male stage actors
Russian State Institute of Performing Arts alumni
Russian male film actors
Russian male television actors
21st-century Russian male actors